Georgia State Route 31 Connector may refer to:

 Georgia State Route 31 Connector (Lakeland 1965–1980): a former connector route of State Route 31 that existed entirely in Lakeland
 Georgia State Route 31 Connector (Lakeland): a connector route of State Route 31 that exists south of Lakeland

031 Connector (Lakeland)